Miguel Aguilar may refer to:

Miguel Aguilar (baseball) (born 1995), Mexican baseball player
Miguel Aguilar (Bolivian footballer) (born 1953), Bolivian footballer
Miguel Aguilar (Salvadoran footballer) (born 1953), Salvadoran football coach
Miguel Aguilar (Mexican footballer) (born 1993), Mexican footballer
Miguel Zerolo Aguilar (born 1957), Canarian politician